Michael Caruso (born July 5, 1988) is a Canadian professional ice hockey defenceman. He is currently playing for the Nottingham Panthers of the Elite Ice Hockey League (EIHL).

Playing career
Caruso was selected in the 4th round, 103rd overall, by the Florida Panthers in the 2008 NHL Entry Draft, after an outstanding junior career with the Guelph Storm of the Ontario Hockey League (OHL).

Following a strong training camp, Caruso was assigned to the Panthers' American Hockey League affiliate, the Rochester Americans, to start the 2008–09 season.

A free agent in the 2014–15 season, Caruso belatedly signed an ECHL contract with the Reading Royals on November 8, 2014. In adding a stabilising influence to the Royals blueline, Caruso contributed with 20 points in 65 games.

On June 12, 2015, Caruso signed his first contract abroad, a one-year deal with Austrian club, Dornbirner EC of the EBEL. After three seasons with the Bulldogs, Caruso left as a free agent, continuing in the EBEL with Hungarian competitors, Fehérvár AV19, on September 15, 2018.

After a season playing for HC Pustertal Wölfe, Caruso signed in the UK for the Nottingham Panthers of the EIHL for the 2022/23 season.

Career statistics

References

External links

1988 births
Living people
Fehérvár AV19 players
Canadian ice hockey defencemen
Dornbirn Bulldogs players
Florida Panthers draft picks
Florida Panthers players
Guelph Storm players
HC Pustertal Wölfe players
Nottingham Panthers players
Sportspeople from Mississauga
Reading Royals players
Rochester Americans players
San Antonio Rampage players
Ice hockey people from Ontario